Border dog Alyi is a 1979 Soviet drama film directed by Yuliy Fait and based on the short story "Alyi" written by Yury Iosifovich Koval.

Plot 
Lyosha Koshkin really wanted to serve on the border and get an official dog. A dream come true: he was Lad Camp, where he got a wonderful East-European Shepherd dog.

Cast 
Vladimir Dubrovsky as Lyosha Koshkin
 dog Brutus as Alyi
Vasili Kupriyanov as Barabulko
Viktor Kosykh as Captain Eliseev
Vladimir Gerasimov as Maslakov
Alexander Kazakov as Ensign Nicholay Bubentsov
Arthur Nischenkin as Ensign Lad Camp
Yana Druz as wife Head outpost's
Nartai Begalin and Igor Kosukhin as infiltrators
Alexander Kurennoy (episode)
Alexander Silin (episode)

Film shooting
Filming took place in parts of the Red Banners Central Asian border district. Participated in the shooting guards 71st Bakharden border detachment, School service dog in Dushanbe, the airmen of the 23rd Dushanbe aviation squadron Soviet Border Troops.

References

External links

1979 films
Gorky Film Studio films
Soviet drama films
Films about dogs
1979 drama films